Levinstein Ltd was an important Manchester based British dye-making company founded by Ivan Levinstein (1845-1916).  In 1918 the firm became part of British Dyestuffs Corporation which in turn formed part of Imperial Chemical Industries in 1926. The firm had operations in Salford, Hulton House in Blackley, and during World War I a sequestered German-owned plant in Ellesmere Port. The firm made the successful Blackley blue or Coomassie brilliant blue, a Manchester Brown, a Manchester Yellow dye and during WWI chemicals for military purposes (including Mustard gas made by the eponymous Levinstein process).

References

External links
  Graces Guide: Levinstein

See also
Hexagon Tower

Chemical companies of the United Kingdom
Defunct manufacturing companies of the United Kingdom
Imperial Chemical Industries